Trewick is a surname. Notable people with the surname include:

Alan Trewick (1941–1993), English footballer
George Trewick (1933–2003), English footballer
John Trewick (born 1957), English footballer and manager
Robert Trewick Bone (1790–1840), English painter

See also
Trawick
Traywick